During the Russian invasion of Ukraine, both Ukrainian and Russian/separatist prisoners of war have suffered several forms of abuse, such as mistreatment, exposure to public curiosity, torture, or even execution.

As of November 2022, the UN Human Rights Monitoring Mission in Ukraine (HRMMU) conducted 159 interviews with prisoners of war held by the Russian and Russian-affiliated forces, and 175 interviews with prisoners of war held by Ukraine. The mission later expressed concern about mistreatment of prisoners of war in the conflict, as it reported that prisoners of war held by both sides had been subject to several forms of abuse.

Ukrainian prisoners of war

Humiliation and mistreatment of Ukrainian soldiers 
Videos showing Ukrainian prisoners of war being forced to sing pro-Russian songs or carrying bruises have attracted concerns about their treatment. , head of the Ukrainian parliament's human rights committee, claimed that Russians forcibly shaved heads of female Ukrainian prisoners. The HRMMU reported that Ukrainian soldiers had their personal belongings stolen during admission into POW camps, and that the prisoners were taken to the camps into overcrowded buses, with little to no access to water and toilets and many being blindfolded and having their wrists tied with duct tape in a way that left many with wounds in these areas. the same was reported inside the camps themselves, with many POWs reporting overcrowded cells, as well as lack of food, hygiene and contact with their families.

Captured Ukrainian soldiers with British citizenship were recorded calling for Boris Johnson to arrange for them to be freed in exchange for pro-Kremlin Ukrainian politician Viktor Medvedchuck. The videos were broadcast separately on Rossiya 24 TV channel, causing MP Robert Jenrick to call the videos a "flagrant breach" of the Third Geneva Convention. A Russian spokeswoman claimed that the Ukrainian prisoners of war with British nationality were being treated humanely, referenced a call by Boris Johnson for British prisoners to be shown mercy and said that in turn the UK should "show mercy" to the Ukrainian citizens by stopping military aid to the Ukrainian government.

Another video circulated showing an interview by pro-Kremlin UK journalist Graham Phillips (former reporter of RT and Zvezda) of Ukrainian war prisoner of British nationality Aiden Aslin. Aslin had served in the Ukrainian army for four years and had been captured by the Russian army in Mariupol. In the video he appears in handcuffs with a cut on his forehead, he is repeatedly called a "mercenary" rather than an official combatant, and is told that his crime is punishable by death. The video was aired on Russian television. The United Nations Human Rights Monitoring Mission in Ukraine later expressed worries about the treatment of Ukrainian prisoners of war held by Russian and separatist forces.

Torture of captured Ukrainian soldiers 
The vast majority of Ukrainian prisoners who were in the hands of the Russian Federation and Russian-affiliated armed groups reported that they had been held in dire conditions of internment and subjected to torture and ill-treatment, including beatings, threats, dog attacks, mock executions, as well as electric and positional torture. Several women and male prisoners were threatened with sexual violence and subjected to degrading treatments and enforced nudity, with a male prisoner reportedly having been pulled with ropes tied around genitalia; The UN agency also collected information about nine possible cases of death during the "admission procedures" to the internment camps.

On 22 July, Human Rights Watch documented the torture of three Ukrainian prisoners of war, members of the Territorial Defense Forces, and the death of two of them in the occupied areas of Kherson and Zaporizhzhia Oblasts.

As of 31 July 2022, OHCHR verified that, out of 35 interviewed, 27 Ukrainian prisoners of war had been subjected to torture by Russian and pro-Russian armed forces and policemen. Victims reported being punched, kicked, stabbed, beaten with police batons and wooden hammers, electrocuted with tasers, hung from the arms or legs, threatened with execution or sexual violence, or shot in the legs. One Ukrainian POW reported that he had been tortured with wires attached with his genitalia and nose, he described how the guards would torture POWs not only for obtaining information, but also "just for intimidation and humiliation", some women prisoners reported that they had not been victims of fisical torture, but that they would be "tormented by the screams of other prisioners of war being tortured in nearby cells".

Also on 31 July, the OHCHR reported that it had received information about the deaths of two Ukrainian prisoners as a result of torture, one beaten and electrocuted on 9 May at the Melitopol airfield, the other beat to death at the Volnovakha penal colony near Olenivka, Donetsk region, on 17 April. 8 other deaths were also under investigation.

Castration and murder of a Ukrainian POW in Pryvillia 

On 28 July, a video was posted on Russian social media which shows a Russian soldier castrating a Ukrainian prisoner of war with a box cutter. On the next day, a continuation video was posted with possibly the same soldiers where they execute the Ukrainian soldier

On 5 August, the Bellingcat group reported that the videos were geolocated to the Pryvillia Sanatorium, located in Pryvillia, Luhansk Oblast, and interviewed the apparent perpetrator by telephone. A white car marked with a Z – a designation marking Russian military vehicles and a militarist symbol used in Russian propaganda – can also be seen in the video; the same car can also be seen in earlier, official videos released by Russian channels, of the Akhmat fighters at the Azot plant during the Russian capture of Severodonetsk. Pryvillia had been captured and occupied by Russians since early July. Bellingcat identified the soldiers involved, including the main perpetrator (an inhabitant of Tuva), as members of the Akhmat unit. The investigation also indicated that the video contained no evidence of tampering or editing.

Execution of surrendering and captured Ukrainian soldiers 
See also Execution of Tymofiy Shadura.
At an Arria-formula meeting of the UN Security Council, the US ambassador-at-large for global criminal justice Beth Van Schaack said that US authorities have evidence that surrendering Ukrainian soldiers were executed by the Russian army in Donetsk. A Ukrainian soldier who was shown among prisoners in a Russian video on 20 April, was confirmed dead days later.

Eyewitness accounts and a video filmed by a security camera provide evidence that on 4 March Russian paratroopers executed at least eight Ukrainian prisoners of war in Bucha.

On 6 March 2023, a video apparently showing Russian soldiers executing a captured Ukrainian soldier after he said "Glory to Ukraine" appeared on social media.

Death sentence against foreign soldiers serving in the Ukrainian armed forces 
Following a trial by the Supreme Court of the Donetsk People's Republic, three foreign-born members of the Ukrainian armed forces, Aiden Aslin, Shaun Pinner, and Brahim Saadoun were declared mercenaries and sentenced to execution by firing squad. Aslin and Pinner, originally from England, had been serving in the Ukrainian military since 2018, while Saadoun had come in 2019 from Morocco to study in Kyiv, having enlisted in November 2021. The ruling was described as illegal because the defendants qualify as prisoners of war under the Geneva Conventions and have not been accused of committing any war crimes.

On 10 June the Office of the United Nations High Commissioner for Human Rights condemned the death sentences and the trial. A spokesperson of the organisation declared that "such trials against prisoners of war amount to a war crime," and highlighted that according to the chief command of Ukraine, all the defendants were part of the Ukrainian armed forces and therefore should not have been considered mercenaries. The OHCHR spokesperson also expressed concern about procedural fairness, stating that "since 2015, we have observed that the so-called judiciary within these self-contained republics has not complied with essential fair trial guarantees, such as public hearings, independence, impartiality of the courts and the right not to be compelled to testify."

The International Bar Association issued a statement saying "that any implementation of the ‘pronounced’ death penalty will be an obvious case of plain murder of Aiden Aslin, Shaun Pinner and Brahim Saaudun and deemed an international war crime. Any perpetrators (anyone engaged in the so-called DPR ‘court’ and anyone who conspired to execute this decision) will be regarded as war criminals", also pointing out that neither Russian nor Ukrainian law allows the death penalty.

On 12 June, Donetsk People's Republic leader Denis Pushilin reiterated that the separatists did not see the trio as prisoners of war, but rather as people who came to Ukraine to kill civilians for money, adding that he saw no reason to modify or mitigate the sentences. Russian State Duma Chairman Vyacheslav Volodin accused the trio of fascism, reiterating that they deserved the death penalty. He added that the Ukrainian armed forces were committing crimes against humanity and were being controlled by a neo-Nazi regime in Kyiv.

On 17 June, the European Court of Human Rights issued an emergency stay of Saadoun Brahim's execution. It stressed that Russia was still obliged to follow the court's rulings. Earlier in June, the Russian State Duma passed a law to end the jurisdiction of the court in Russia, but it had not yet been signed into law.

On 8 July the DPR lifted a moratorium on the death penalty. On 21 September five British citizens held by pro-Russian separatists were released, including those sentenced to death, the Moroccan citizen Saadoun Brahim was also freed after a prisoner exchange between Ukraine and Russia.

Olenivka prison massacre 

On 29 July 2022, a Russian-operated prison in Molodizhne near Olenivka, Donetsk Oblast, was destroyed, killing 53 Ukrainian prisoners of war and leaving 75 wounded. The prisoners were mainly soldiers from the Azovstal complex, the last Ukrainian stronghold in the siege of Mariupol.

Both Ukrainian and Russian authorities accused each other of the attack on the prison. The General Staff of the Ukrainian Armed Forces said that the Russians blew up the barrack in order to cover up the torture and murder of Ukrainian POWs that had been taking place there, and Ukrainian authorities provided what they said were satellite images of pre-dug graves and intercepted communications indicating Russian culpability, while Russians suggest that a HIMARS rocket was shot from Ukrainian territory.

On 3 August, the UN secretary-general Antonio Guterres announced his decision to establish a fact-finding mission, as requested both by the Russia and Ukraine.

Russian prisoners of war

Mistreatment of captured Russian soldiers

Public exposure of Russian POWs 
Since 27 February, the Ukrainian Ministry of Internal Affairs has shared on social media photos and videos of killed Russian soldiers, soon followed by dozens of videos of prisoners of war under interrogation, sometimes blindfolded or bound, revealing their names and personal information, and expressing regret over their involvement in the invasion. The videos have raised concerns about potential violations of Article 13 Third Geneva Convention, which states that prisoners of war should be protected "against insults and public curiosity." On 7 March, Amnesty International released a statement saying that "it is essential that all parties to the conflict fully respect the rights of prisoners of war," and saying that filmed prisoners of war and their families could be put at risk of reprisals following repatriation to Russia.

On 16 March, Human Rights Watch described the videos as intentional humiliation and shaming, and urged the Ukrainian authorities to stop posting them on social media and messaging apps. Analogous concerns were expressed by various Western newspapers A spokeswoman for the UN High Commissioner for Human Rights, Elizabeth Throssell, said that the videos, if genuine, were likely to be incompatible with human dignity and current international humanitarian law. Interviewed by Der Spiegel, international law expert  said that "letting POWs call home is actually a good thing, filming it and putting it online however is not," as it was incompatible with the Geneva Convention on the treatment of prisoners of war.

Torture of Russian and separatist soldiers 

Some Russian and Russian-affiliated prisoners of war who were in the hands of Ukrainian forces made allegations of summary executions, torture and ill-treatment by members of the Ukrainian forces, in some cases, Russian prisoners were stabbed and subjected to electric torture. Ukraine later launched criminal investigations into allegations of mistreatment of Russian prisoners of war by the Ukrainian Armed Forces.

According to the 26 March 2022 OHCHR report, the HRMMU was aware of one allegation of a threat of sexual violence by an Ukrainian soldier, in which "an captured Russian military member was threatened with castration on camera".

As of 31 July 2022, OHCHR documented 50 cases of torture and ill-treatment of prisoners of war in the power of Ukraine, including cases of Russian and separatist soldiers being beaten, kicked or shot during capture or interrogation, some also reported suffering electrocution and positional torture while under interrogation. One prisoner of war was reportedly suffocated by Ukrainian policemen of the Kharkiv SBU during his interrogation. Many Russian and separatist soldiers also reported "horrible conditions" during transport to POW camps, with many being stripped naked and having their wrists tied.

Torture of Russian POWs in Mala Rohan 

According to an report by the UN High Commissioner for Human Rights (OHCHR), members of Ukrainian armed forces shot the legs of three captured Russian soldiers and tortured Russian soldiers who were wounded. The incident is likely to have occurred on the evening of 25 March in Mala Rohan, south-east of Kharkiv, in an area recently recaptured by Ukrainian troops, and was first reported following the publication on social media accounts of a video of unknown authorship between 27 March and 28 March. One of the video's versions depicts a number of soldiers lying on the ground; many appear to be bleeding from leg wounds. Three prisoners are brought out of a vehicle and shot in the leg  by someone off-camera. According to the OHCHR, as a documented case of summary execution and torture of prisoners of war, the incident qualifies as a war crime.

Execution of surrendering and captured Russian soldiers 
On 6 April a video apparently showing Ukrainian troops of the Georgian Legion executing captured Russian soldiers was posted on Telegram. The video was verified by The New York Times and by Reuters. A wounded Russian soldier was seemingly shot twice by a Ukrainian soldier while lying on the ground. Three dead Russian soldiers, including one with a head wound and hands tied behind his back, were shown near the soldier. The video appeared to have been filmed on a road north of the village of Dmytrivka, seven miles south of Bucha.

The Georgian Legion's commander Mamuka Mamulashvili acknowledged that killing of Russian prisoners of war was done under his own orders by a patrol of the Georgian Legion. In an interview published by the YouTube channel of the dissident Russian businessman Mikhail Khodorkovsky, he said about the treatment of Russian prisoners: "Sometimes we tie them hands and feet. I speak for the Georgian Legion, we will never take Russian prisoners." Mamoulashvili justified no quarter for Russian soldiers as a response to the Bucha massacre.

Mamuka Mamulashvili has also denied the allegations of war crimes by the Georgian Legion, saying the video does not show members of the Legion. Some Ukrainian authorities (such as Minister of Foreign Affairs Dmytro Kuleba) promised an investigation. While others took less clear positions.

'No quarter' orders 
On 2 March 2022, after the shelling of residential areas, Ukraine's Special Operations Forces threatened that Russian artillerymen will no longer be taken prisoner, but immediately killed. On 29 June, the OHCHR documented three incidents where Ukrainian servicemen and one incident where Russian serviceman made public threats of giving no quarter to Russian prisoners of war.

Makiivka surrender incident 

On 12 November, a video appeared on pro-Ukrainian websites showing the bodies of soldiers in Russian uniforms lying on the ground in a farmyard in the Makiivka area. On 17 November, more footage emerged, taken from the ground by a person at the scene. The video shows the Russian soldiers as they exit a building, surrender, and lay face down on the ground. Then another Russian soldier emerges from the same building and opens fire on the Ukrainian soldiers who are surprised. An aerial video from the site documents the aftermath, with at least 12 bodies of Russian soldiers, most positioned as they were when they surrendered, bleeding from gunshot wounds to the head.

The authenticity of the videos was verified by The New York Times. Russia and Ukraine accused each other of war crimes, with Russia accusing Ukraine of "mercilessly shooting unarmed Russian P.O.W.s," and Ukraine accusing the Russians of opening fire while surrendering. Ukraine's officials said the Prosecutor General’s office would investigate the video footage as the incident may qualify as a crime of  "perfidy" committed by the Russian troops in feigning surrender. On 25 November the UN High Commissioner for Human Rights Volker Türk  said “Our Monitoring Mission in Ukraine has conducted a preliminary analysis indicating that these disturbing videos are highly likely to be authentic in what they show” and called on the Ukrainian authorities to investigate the allegations of summary executions of Russian prisoners of war "in a manner that is – and is seen to be – independent, impartial, thorough, transparent, prompt and effective.”

Prosecution of separatist POWs 
The HRMMU also expressed concern about the prosecution of pro-Russian separatists for mere participation in the hostilities, which is prohibited under international humanitarian law.

See also

 Allegations of genocide of Ukrainians in the 2022 Russian invasion of Ukraine
 Casualties of the Russo-Ukrainian War & Prisoners of war
 Russian war crimes & Ukraine
 War crimes in Donbas

References

External links

2022 Russian invasion of Ukraine
Russo-Ukrainian War
Prisoners of war by conflict
Ukrainian prisoners of war
Russian prisoners of war
Russia–Ukraine relations